Dino Ciccarelli (born February 8, 1960) is a Canadian former professional ice hockey player who played 19 seasons in the National Hockey League, primarily with the Minnesota North Stars, but also notably with the Detroit Red Wings, with whom he had his third-highest scoring season. He scored 1,200 points in his NHL career.  His 608 career NHL goals are also the most goals scored by a draft-eligible player who was not drafted by an NHL team. Ciccarelli was elected to the Hockey Hall of Fame in 2010.

Playing career

Sarnia Bees
Ciccarelli grew up playing minor hockey in his hometown of Sarnia, Ontario, in the Southwestern Ontario Minor Hockey League of the Ontario Minor Hockey Association. He made Sarnia's Jr. 'B' hockey team as a 15-year-old in the fall of 1975 and ended up leading it in scoring with 45 goals and 43 assists for 88 points in just 40 games. He is one of two Sarnia Jr. 'B' graduates to go on to be elected to the Hockey Hall of Fame (the other being Phil Esposito, who led the Sarnia Legionnaires in scoring in 1961).

London Knights
Ciccarelli joined the London Knights of the OMJHL as a 16-year-old for the 1976–77 season.  In his first season with the Knights, Ciccarelli had 39 goals and 82 points in 66 games, finishing fifth in team scoring.  In the playoffs, Ciccarelli had 11 goals and 24 points in 20 games, as London lost to the Ottawa 67's in the J. Ross Robertson Cup finals.

In his second season with the Knights in 1977–78, Ciccarelli scored a league high 72 goals, and added 70 assists for 142 points, which was third highest total in the OMJHL.  In the post-season, Ciccarelli contributed six goals and 16 points in nine games.  After the season, Ciccarelli was awarded the Jim Mahon Memorial Trophy, which is given to the highest scoring right winger in the OMJHL.

Injuries cut short Ciccarelli's 1978–79 season, as he appeared in only 30 games, scoring eight goals and 19 points.  In seven playoff games, Ciccarelli scored three goals and eight points.  After not being selected in the NHL Entry Draft, Ciccarelli signed a contract with the Minnesota North Stars on September 28, 1979.

The North Stars kept Ciccarelli with the Knights for the 1979–80, and Ciccarelli rebounded, scoring 50 goals and 103 points.  In five games in the playoffs, Ciccarelli scored two goals, and finished with eight points.

Minnesota North Stars
Ciccarelli made his professional hockey debut with the Oklahoma City Stars of the CHL at the end of the 1979–80 season.  In six games with Oklahoma City, Ciccarelli had three goals and five points.

He spent most of the 1980–81 season with Oklahoma City, playing in 48 games, scoring 32 goals and 57 points.  Ciccarelli was brought up to the National Hockey League, and in 32 games with the Minnesota North Stars, Ciccarelli had 18 goals and 30 points.  In the playoffs, Ciccarelli scored 14 goals and 21 points in 19 games, as the North Stars lost to the New York Islanders in the 1981 Stanley Cup Finals.

Ciccarelli spent the entire 1981–82 NHL season with the North Stars, playing in 76 games, scoring a team high 55 goals, while earning 106 points for the season. During the season, Ciccarelli played in the 1982 NHL All-Star Game, hosted by the Washington Capitals, with the Campbell Conference, where he assisted on a goal by Wayne Gretzky in a 4–2 loss to the Wales Conference.  In the playoffs, Ciccarelli had three goals and four points in four games.

He saw a decrease in offensive production during the 1982–83 season, scoring 37 goals and 75 points in 77 games, which was 18 fewer goals and 31 fewer points than the previous season. Ciccarelli did appear in the 1983 NHL All-Star Game, hosted by the New York Islanders.  Ciccarelli had a goal and an assist as the Campbell Conference defeated the Wales Conference 9–3. In the post-season, Ciccarelli appeared in nine games, scoring four goals and 10 points.

Ciccarelli had another solid season with Minnesota in 1983–84, scoring 38 goals and 71 points in 79 games, helping the North Stars into the playoffs once again. In 16 playoff games, Ciccarelli had four goals and nine points, as the North Stars lost to the Edmonton Oilers in the Campbell Conference finals.

Injuries cut short Ciccarelli's season in 1984–85, playing in only 51 games, Ciccarelli scored 15 goals and 32 points, his lowest point total since his rookie season in 1980–81, and the lowest goal total of his NHL career. In nine playoff games, Ciccarelli had three goals and six points.

Ciccarelli had a healthy 1985–86 season, playing in 75 games, he led the North Stars with 44 goals, while finishing second in points with 89, which were his highest totals since 1981–82. In five playoff games, Ciccarelli was held to an assist.

In 1986–87, Ciccarelli improved his offensive numbers once again, scoring 52 goals and 103 points in 80 games, which both led the club in scoring.  The North Stars struggled during the season, and failed to qualify for the post season.

Ciccarelli had his third straight 40+ goal season in 1987–88, as he once again led Minnesota with 41 goals and 86 points in 67 games.  It was another tough season for the team though, as they missed the playoffs for the second straight season.

In 1988–89, Ciccarelli made his first all-star game appearance in six years, as he played with the Campbell Conference in the 1989 NHL All-Star Game held in Edmonton, Alberta. In the game, Ciccarelli assisted on a goal by Steve Yzerman, as the Campbell Conference won the game over the Wales Conference by a score of 9–5. Overall with Minnesota, Ciccarelli played in 65 games, scoring 32 goals and 59 points. On March 7, 1989, the North Stars traded Ciccarelli and Bob Rouse to the Washington Capitals for Mike Gartner and Larry Murphy.

Washington Capitals
Ciccarelli finished the 1988–89 season with the Washington Capitals, playing just 11 games, Ciccarelli scored 12 goals and 15 points, helping the team into the playoffs.  He played his first game as a Capital on March 8, 1989, getting no points in a 3–2 loss to the Montreal Canadiens.  He scored his first goal with Washington on March 11, 1989, scoring against John Vanbiesbrouck in a 4–2 win over the New York Rangers.  On March 18, 1989, Ciccarelli had a four-goal, seven point game in a huge 8–2 victory over the Hartford Whalers.  Ciccarelli appeared in his first playoff game with the Capitals on April 5, 1989, getting no points in a 3–2 win over the Philadelphia Flyers.  He scored his first playoff goal with Washington on April 6, 1989, scoring against Ron Hextall in a 3–2 loss.  Ciccarelli played in six games, scoring three goals and six points as the Capitals were eliminated by the Flyers.

In Ciccarelli's first full season with the Capitals, he scored 41 goals in 1989–90, which marked his fifth consecutive season of 40+ goals, while finishing with a team high 79 points. Ciccarelli had a four-goal game against the Quebec Nordiques on February 6, 1990, in a 12–2 victory.  In the playoffs, Ciccarelli had eight goals and 11 points in eight games before suffering an injury on April 21, 1990, against the New York Rangers that would end his season.  Ciccarelli had a hat trick in the playoffs, scoring three goals and an assist against the New Jersey Devils in a 5–4 overtime win on April 5, 1990.

Ciccarelli missed 26 games during the 1990–91, in which he scored 21 goals and 39 points, his lowest totals since 1984–85.  He did score a hat trick against the Edmonton Oilers on February 8, 1991, in a 6–3 win. Ciccarelli was productive in the playoffs, scoring five goals and nine points in 11 games.

He rebounded in the 1991–92, as Ciccarelli scored 38 goals, which was a team high, while earning 76 points, helping the Capitals into the playoffs once again.  In the playoffs, Ciccarelli had a four-goal game on April 25, 1992, as Washington defeated the Pittsburgh Penguins 7–2. In seven games, he scored five goals and nine points. On June 20, 1992, Ciccarelli was traded from the Capitals to the Detroit Red Wings for Kevin Miller.

Detroit Red Wings
Ciccarelli made his debut with the Detroit Red Wings on October 6, 1992, getting no points in a 4–1 loss to the Winnipeg Jets.  On October 8, 1992, Ciccarelli earned his first goal as a Red Wing, scoring against Kelly Hrudey of the Los Angeles Kings in a 5–3 victory.  Ciccarelli finished his first season with Detroit with 41 goals and 97 points, which were both the second highest totals on the team.  Ciccarelli's 97 points were his highest since 1986–87, when he recorded 103 with the Minnesota North Stars. Ciccarelli played his first Playoff game with the Red Wings on April 19, 1993, earning an assist in a 6–3 win over the Toronto Maple Leafs. Ciccarelli scored his first playoff goal as a member of the Red Wings on April 27, 1993, against Felix Potvin in a 5–4 loss to the Maple Leafs.  On April 29, 1993, Ciccarelli had a hat trick for the Red Wings in a 7–3 win over Toronto.  Overall, Ciccarelli appeared in seven playoff games, scoring four goals and six points.

Ciccarelli saw his point total decline by 40 in the 1993–94 season, as he scored 28 goals and 57 points in 66 games.  He did have a six-point game against the Vancouver Canucks on April 5, 1994, scoring four goals and adding two assists in an 8–3 victory.  In the post-season, Ciccarelli had five goals and seven points in seven games.

With a shortened 1994–95 due to the lockout, Ciccarelli appeared in 42 games, scoring 16 goals and 43 points, which placed him third in team scoring.  Ciccarelli had a four assist game against the Winnipeg Jets on March 22, 1995, in a 6–3 win.  In the playoffs, Ciccarelli had a hat trick against the Dallas Stars on May 11, 1995, in a 5–1 victory.  He finished the playoffs with nine goals and 11 points in 16 games, as the Red Wings lost to the New Jersey Devils in the 1995 Stanley Cup Finals.

In 1995–96, Ciccarelli scored 22 goals and 43 points in 64 games, helping the Red Wings set an NHL record for wins in a season with 62.  In the post-season, Ciccarelli had six goals and eight points in 17 games.  In game six of the 1996 Western Conference Finals, Claude Lemieux laid a vicious hit on Kris Draper. The Red Wings lost to the Avalanche in six games and Lemieux was given suspensions in the first two games of the Stanley Cup Finals. When interviewed after the game, Ciccarelli reacted and coldly stated, "I can't believe I shook this guy's friggin' hand after the game! That pisses me right off!".

On August 27, 1996, the Red Wings traded Ciccarelli to the Tampa Bay Lightning for a fourth-round draft pick in the 1998 NHL Entry Draft.

Tampa Bay Lightning
Ciccarelli played his first game as a member of the Tampa Bay Lightning on October 5, 1996, getting a goal and two points in a 4–3 win over the Pittsburgh Penguins.  On November 8, 1996, Ciccarelli had a hat trick against the Pittsburgh Penguins in a 5–5 tie.  Ciccarelli played in the 1997 NHL All-Star Game held in San Jose, California, where he had an assist for the Eastern Conference in an 11–7 win over the Western Conference.  He finished the 1996–97 season playing in 77 games, scoring a team high 35 goals, while earning 60 points. Notably, he scored the final goal in the last game that the Hartford Whalers played in on April 13, 1997, scoring the only goal for the Lightning in a 2–1 loss.

He began the 1997–98 season with the Lightning; he played in 34 games with Tampa Bay, scoring 11 goals and 17 points.  On January 15, 1998, the Lightning traded Ciccarelli and Jeff Norton to the Florida Panthers for Mark Fitzpatrick and Jody Hull.

Florida Panthers
Ciccarelli played his first game with the Florida Panthers on January 21, 1998.  He scored his first goal with Florida on January 24, 1998, against Kelly Hrudey of the San Jose Sharks in a 1–1 tie.  He finished the season with five goals and 16 points in 28 games with the Panthers.

Ciccarelli had an injury plagued 1998–99 season, as he missed the majority of the season after suffering a back injury against the Chicago Blackhawks on November 4, 1998.  He played in only 14 games, scoring six goals and seven points.  On August 31, 1999, Ciccarelli announced his retirement.

International career
Ciccarelli played with Canada at various international events during his career.  At the 1980 World Junior Ice Hockey Championships held in Helsinki, Finland, Ciccarelli had five goals and six points in five games, as Canada finished in fifth place.  At the 1982 IIHF World Hockey Championship held in Finland, Ciccarelli had two goals and three points in nine games, as the Canadians won the Bronze Medal.  Ciccarelli also played in the 1987 IIHF World Hockey Championship in Austria, getting four goals and six points in 10 games as Canada finished in fourth place.

Assaults
Ciccarelli's career featured some controversial moments, both on and off the ice.  In 1987, he pleaded guilty to indecent exposure and received probation.  Then on January 6, 1988, in a game played at Maple Leaf Gardens, Ciccarelli attacked then-Maple Leafs rookie defenceman Luke Richardson with his stick.  As a result of this incident, Ciccarelli was convicted of assault, fined $1,000, and sentenced to one day in jail.

In May 1990, while playing for the Capitals, Ciccarelli was accused of raping a 17-year-old girl outside a bar, alongside teammates Geoff Courtnall, Scott Stevens, and Neil Sheehy. The court case fell apart, though a spokesperson for the Metropolitan police at the time stated that the police “have sufficient grounds to believe that a criminal offense did occur.”

Hall of Fame
Ciccarelli was inducted into the Hockey Hall of Fame in 2010, eight years after he first became eligible.  Press reports speculated that his criminal activity was the reason it took him years to gain entrance.

His junior team, the London Knights, retired Ciccarelli's number 8.

Ciccarelli owned the nightclub Club 22 in Shelby Charter Township, named for the jersey number he wore with the Capitals, Red Wings, Lightning and Panthers.  It was closed in 2011. Shortly after closing, Ciccarelli opened a sports bar in the same location. The name of the establishment is Ciccarelli's Sports Bar Theater, named after the "theater" style atmosphere. He has since opened two additional sports bars, one across from the Palace of Auburn Hills; and the other at the site of the former Post Bar in downtown Detroit, near Cobo Center. The Detroit location is only open for Red Wings home games and other special events.

Awards and achievements
OMJHL Second All-Star Team (1978)
NHL All-Star Game (1982, 1983, 1989, 1997)
 World Ice Hockey Championships bronze medalist 1982

NHL records
Most Points by a rookie, One playoff season (21) "1981 Playoffs"
Most Goals by a rookie, One playoff season (14) "1981 Playoffs"
Fastest Player to Score 20 Goals (15 Games) "1986–87 Regular Season" – 11/11/1986

Career statistics

Regular season and playoffs

International

See also
 List of NHL statistical leaders
 List of NHL players with 1000 points
 List of NHL players with 500 goals

References

External links
 

1960 births
Living people
Canadian ice hockey right wingers
Canadian people of Italian descent
Detroit Red Wings players
Florida Panthers players
Hockey Hall of Fame inductees
Ice hockey people from Ontario
London Knights players
Minnesota North Stars players
National Hockey League All-Stars
Sportspeople convicted of crimes
Sportspeople from Sarnia
Tampa Bay Lightning players
Undrafted National Hockey League players
Violence in sports
Washington Capitals players